The Houston Express was a soccer club based in Houston, Texas that competed in the SISL.

The Express played in the Houston Indoor Soccer Center.

Year-by-year

External links
 The Year in American Soccer – 1989
 The Year in American Soccer – 1990

References

USISL teams
Defunct indoor soccer clubs in the United States
Soccer clubs in Texas
E